Gayasan , also known as Gaya Mountain, is a mountain in Gyeongsangbuk-do, eastern South Korea. This mountain reaches an elevation of 1,433 metres. It is located in Gayasan National Park, which is named in honor of this mountain.

This mountain has two major peaks: one of them is Sangwangbong Peak, for which the height is 1,430 meters, and the other, Chulbulbong, is 1,433 above sea level.

See also
 List of mountains in Korea

References

Mountains of South Korea
Mountains of North Gyeongsang Province
Mountains of South Gyeongsang Province
One-thousanders of South Korea
Sobaek Mountains